Joseph F. Timilty (October 17, 1894 – October 2, 1980) was an American law enforcement officer and politician who served as Boston Police Commissioner from 1936 to 1943.

Timilty was appointed police commissioner by Governor James Michael Curley on November 25, 1936. Prior to accepting the position, Timilty was a member of the Governor's military staff.

He was police commissioner during the Cocoanut Grove fire.

On March 27, 1943, Timilty and six of his subordinates were indicted on charges of conspiracy to permit the operation of gambling houses and the registration of bets. Immediately after the indictment he  was placed on leave by Governor Leverett Saltonstall. The indictment was quashed and on June 5 Timilty returned to duty. He was re-indicted on June 25. On July 2, Judge Frank J. Donahue quashed the second indictment. Governor Saltonstall chose not to re-appoint Timilty and on November 25, 1943, Timilty's tenure as Police Commissioner ended.

Timilty was a candidate for Mayor of Boston in 1951. He finished a distant third in the primary behind incumbent John Hynes and former mayor James Michael Curley.

Timilty died on October 2, 1980, in Bal Harbour, Florida.

See also
The Timilty family

References

1894 births
1980 deaths
Commissioners of the Boston Police Department
Politicians from Boston
People from Miami-Dade County, Florida
Timilty family